Eagle Air (Icelandic name: Flugfélagið Ernir) is an Icelandic airline. It is based at Reykjavík Airport and offers domestic flights, charter services, and adventure tours in Iceland.

History
Eagle Air was founded in 1970 by Hörður Guðmundsson and his family as a transportation and security link in the Westfjords, one of the most remote parts of Iceland. The airline's initial focus was on ambulance and mail services. Propeller-driven aircraft operated by Eagle Air included the Helio Courier, Britten-Norman Islander, Piper Aztec, Piper Chieftain, Cessna Titan, de Havilland Canada DHC-6-300 Twin Otter, Cessna 206 and Cessna 185. Eagle Air also had a domestic charter flight component, which moved into the international arena in the early 1980s. Eagle Air flew charters to airports in Iceland, Greenland, Scandinavia and Europe.

In the early 1990s, Eagle Air accepted key assignments from the International Red Cross to operate in Kenya, Sudan, Mozambique and Angola, delivering aid supplies to civil war stricken regions.

In 1995, Eagle Air moved its headquarters from Ísafjörður to Reykjavík after most of its airmail contracts were discontinued due to the opening of the Vestfjarðagöng tunnel. It later sold off most of its airplanes and turned in its air operator's certificate (AOC) but kept one plane along with other assets. The company was restarted in Reykjavík in 2003. In 2006 it reapplied for an AOC took over service to destinations where Air Iceland stopped flying. It began scheduled services to Árneshreppur, Bíldudalur, Höfn, and Sauðárkrókur, and in August 2010 to Heimaey in the Westman Islands. It now flies to Höfn, Húsavík and Vestmannaeyjar.

On 27 February 2018, Birna Borg Gunnarsdóttir, the granddaughter of founder Hörður Guðmundsson, became the first female pilot in the airlines history.

In January 2023, The airline Mýflug, together with another investors, bought a 77.1 percent stake in Eagle Air.

Destinations

Current destinations
From Reykjavík Airport (RKV) to: 
 Hornafjörður Airport (HFN) in Höfn
 Húsavík Airport (HZK)
 Vestmannaeyjar Airport (VEY)

Former destinations
 Bíldudalur Airport (BIU)
 Gjögur Airport (GJR)
 Holt Airport (FLI)
 Ísafjörður Airport (IFJ)
 Patreksfjörður Airport (PFJ)
 Sauðárkrókur Airport (SAK)
 Suðureyri Airport (SUY)
 Þingeyri Airport

Air charter services

Ambulance flights 
Eagle Air has decades of experience in ambulance flights, and flies aircraft with pressurised cabins that can fly above weather for patient comfort. Oxygen and oxygen masks are on board, and a doctor and/or medical crew can be arranged if requested.

Freight 
Eagle Air operates freight flights to any location in Iceland, overseas or at sea.

Aerial photography 
Eagle Air has aircraft which are well suited for aerial photography, livestock inventory, and other similar projects.

Current fleet 
Eagle Air currently operates the following aircraft:

British Aerospace Jetstream 32: TF-ORA, TF-ORC, TF-ORD- twin engine turboprop aircraft
Cessna 207A Stationair 8: TF-ORB - single engine piston aircraft
Dornier 328: TF-ORI - twin engine turboprop for 32 passengers

Accidents and incidents
 On 5 April 1986, an Eagle Air Piper PA-23-250 Aztec with registration TF-ORM got caught in a downdraft and crashed in Ljósufjöll in Snæfellsnes, killing four of the six people on board.
 On 11 January 1987, an Eagle Air Piper Chieftain with registration TF-ORN, crashed in the ocean outside of Skutulsfjörður, in bad weather, killing the pilot.

References

External links

Official website 
Official website 

Airlines of Iceland
Airlines established in 1970
Airlines disestablished in 1995
Airlines established in 2003